Kamel Athie Flores (born 28 February 1950) is a Mexican politician affiliated with the PRI. He is a former Deputy of the LXII Legislature of the Mexican Congress representing Chihuahua.

References

1950 births
Living people
Politicians from Chihuahua (state)
Institutional Revolutionary Party politicians
21st-century Mexican politicians
People from Ciudad Cuauhtémoc, Chihuahua
Instituto Politécnico Nacional alumni
Autonomous University of Chihuahua alumni
Academic staff of the Instituto Politécnico Nacional
Deputies of the LXII Legislature of Mexico
Members of the Chamber of Deputies (Mexico) for Chihuahua (state)